Huanggutunzhan is a station on Line 9 of the Shenyang Metro. The station did not open with the rest of Phase 1 of Line 9 due to demolition work. The station was opened on 30 March 2021.

Station Layout

References 

Railway stations in China opened in 2021
Shenyang Metro stations